The 2011–12 Liga Indonesia First Division season was the seventeenth season of the Liga Indonesia First Division. The competition was organized by the PSSI. Starting this season, the competition was intended to be for footballers under twenty-three years of age.

The competition began on December 16, 2011 and finished on 30 October 2012.

First stage
Total 66 clubs will participate in this season, divided into 12 groups. First stage start on December 16, 2011 and finished on March 13, 2012.

Group I
All matches were played in H. Dimurtala Stadium, Banda Aceh with single match home tournament system.

Group II
All round I matches were played in Baharuddin Siregar Stadium, Lubukpakam and round II were played in Mutiara Kisaran Stadium, Asahan Regency.

Group III
All matches were played with home and away system.

Group IV
All matches were played with home and away system.

Group V
All matches were played with home and away system.

Group VI
All matches were played with home and away system.

Group VII
All matches were played with home and away system.

Group VIII
All matches were played in Untung Suropati Stadium, Pasuruan and Pragas Stadium, Sumbawa

Group IX
All round I matches were played in Sangata Main Stadium, East Kutai Regency and round II were played in Kebon Sajoek Stadium, Pontianak.

Group X
All matches were played with home and away system.

Group XI
All round I matches were played in Sanggeng Stadium, Manokwari and round II wereplayed in November 16 Stadium, Fak-Fak Regency.
All matches were played with home and away system.

Group XII
All matches were played in Mandala Stadium and Barnabas Youwe Stadium, Jayapura

Second stage
Total 24 clubs will participate in this stage, divided into 6 groups.

Third stage
Total 12 clubs will participate in this stage, divided into 3 groups. Three group winner and best runner-up advances to the Semifinal. This stage started on 20 June and finished on 27 June 2012.

Group H

All match played in Purnawarman Stadium, Purwakarta

Group I

All match played in Tambun Stadium, Bekasi

Group J

All match played in Tambun Stadium, Bekasi

Final stage
The final stage of 2012 Liga Indonesia First Division (PSSI) was scheduled to be played on 29–30 October 2012. Four clubs qualify for this stage are Persebangga Purbalingga (Group H), PS Siak (Group I), Persipon Pontianak (Group J) and Persekap Pasuruan City (Best runner-up, Group J).

All matches will be played in Tambun Stadium, Bekasi
Semifinal, Senin (29/10).
Persibangga Purbalingga vs PS Siak  4-1 pukul 13.00 WIB
Persekap Kota Pasuruan vs Persipon Pontianak 2-0 (pukul 15.30 WIB)

Final, Selasa (30/10).
Persibangga 
Persekap Kota Pasuruan vs Persibangga Purbalingga 2-1 (pukul 15.00 WIB)
Muhammad Nurhadi (24), Bagus Cahyono (77); Inggrit Prayitno (11).

Season statistics

Top scorers

References

Liga Indonesia First Division seasons
3